Dark-eared brown dove has been split into two species:
 Tawitawi brown dove, Phapitreron cinereiceps
 Mindanao brown dove, Phapitreron brunneiceps

Bird common names